The following is List of Universities and Colleges in Jiangxi.

References
List of Chinese Higher Education Institutions — Ministry of Education
List of Chinese universities, including official links
Jiangxi Institutions Admitting International Students

 
Jiangxi